Oakwood School may refer to:

U.S. 
 Oakwood School (Los Angeles), K-12, San Fernando Valley region of Los Angeles
 Oakwood School, Morgan Hill, preschool through college prep in Silicon Valley
 Oakwood Friends School, Poughkeepsie, New York
 Oakwood High School (Ohio), Montgomery County, Ohio

U.K. 
 Oakwood High School, Rotherham, Rotherham, South Yorkshire, England
 Oakwood Preparatory School, Funtington, West Sussex, England
 Oakwood School, Horley, Horley, Surrey, England
 Oak Wood School, Hillingdon, Greater London, England

Australia 
 Oakwood School, Tasmania
 Oakwood State School in Oakwood, Queensland

See also
 Oakwood (disambiguation)
 Oakwood Academy (disambiguation)